Jairo Pereira Reis (born March 5, 1991) is a Brazilian football player.

References

1991 births
Living people
Brazilian footballers
J2 League players
Tochigi SC players
Association football forwards